Albu Sanvan (also Romanized as Ālbū Sanvān) is a village in Elhayi Rural District, in the Central District of Ahvaz County, Khuzestan Province, Iran. At the 2006 census, its population was 894, in 164 families.

References 

Populated places in Ahvaz County